The year 621 BC was a year of the pre-Julian Roman calendar. In the Roman Empire, it was known as year 133 Ab urbe condita . The denomination 621 BC for this year has been used since the early medieval period, when the Anno Domini calendar era became the prevalent method in Europe for naming years.

Events

Births

Deaths
 Duke Mu of Qin, ruler of Qin (state)
 Duke Xiang of Jin, ruler of Jin (state)
 Zhan Huo, Chinese governor

References